Chèvréchard is a French cheese manufacturer specializing in goat cheeses. It is located in the goat-cheese producing region of Nouvelle-Aquitaine. In January 2007, the French dairy cooperative Valcrest acquired a 35% interest in the company, with the expectation of acquiring the balance later that year.

Chèvréchard is the producer of Clochette and Aperichevre cheeses.

See also

 List of cheesemakers

References

External links 
 

French cheeses
Cheesemakers
Dairy products companies of France
Companies based in Nouvelle-Aquitaine